Marble Arch is a London Underground station in the City of Westminster. The station is between Lancaster Gate and Bond Street stations on the Central line, and is in Travelcard Zone 1.

History
The station was opened on 30 July 1900 by the Central London Railway (CLR).

Like all the original stations on the CLR, Marble Arch was served by lifts to the platforms but the station was reconstructed in the early 1930s to accommodate escalators. This saw the closure of the original station building, designed by the architect Harry Bell Measures, that was situated on the corner of Quebec Street and Oxford Street, and a replacement sub-surface ticket hall opened further to the west. The new arrangements came into use on 15 August 1932. The original surface building was later demolished.

The platforms, originally lined in plain white tiles, were refitted with decorative vitreous enamel panels in 1985. The panel graphics were designed by Annabel Grey.

The station was modernised in 2010, resulting in new finishes in all areas of the station, apart from the retention of many of the decorative enamel panels at platform level.

The station today
The station is named after the Marble Arch nearby and is located at the north east side of the Marble Arch junction, at the western end of Oxford Street.

There is a siding to the west of the station allowing trains from Epping, Hainault and Woodford to terminate here. It is not commonly used but it is still retained for emergencies and when engineering works take place.

Incidents

On 27 April 2018, a 90-year old man, Robert Malpas, was suddenly and without warning pushed onto the train tracks,  suffering a broken pelvis and a head wound. A bystander rescued him from the tracks, and the perpetrator - who was unknown to Malpas - was later found guilty of attempted murder and jailed for life. The incident was captured on CCTV.

Connections
London Buses routes 2, 6, 13, 16, 23, 30, 36, 74, 94, 98, 137, 148, 159, 189, 274, 390 and 414 serve the station.

See also
The Mysterious Planet, a serial of Doctor Who which uses Marble Arch as a plot point.
"London Homesick Blues," a 1974 song by Gary P. Nunn references Marble Arch Station.

Gallery

References

External links
 London Transport Museum Photographic Archive
 
 

Central line (London Underground) stations
London Underground Night Tube stations
Tube stations in the City of Westminster
Former Central London Railway stations
Railway stations in Great Britain opened in 1900
Railway stations with vitreous enamel panels
Buildings and structures in Mayfair